Flat Gap High School, also known as Flat Gap School Community Center, is a historic high school building located at Pound, Wise County, Virginia. It was built in 1935–1936 and is a one-story building with a three-part plan, consisting of a front gabled midsection and set-back, side-gable wings. The Classical Revival design references include rusticated stonework, molded cornice with gable returns, and a round-arched principal entrance with granite voussoirs and keystone.  It ceased use as a school in the 1970s, and has been adapted for use as a community center.

It was listed on the National Register of Historic Places in 2009.

References

School buildings on the National Register of Historic Places in Virginia
Neoclassical architecture in Virginia
School buildings completed in 1936
Schools in Wise County, Virginia
National Register of Historic Places in Wise County, Virginia